Tepebaşı is a municipality and district governorate in Greater Eskişehir, Turkey. Eskişehir is one of 30 metropolitan centers in Turkey with more than one municipality within city borders. In Eskişehir there are two second-level municipalities in addition to Greater Eskişehir municipality. The Mayor of Tepebaşı is Ahmet Ataç.

Geography 
It lies to the north of Porsuk River which flows through the center of Eskişehir. The population of Tepebaşı was 298,894 which is 44% of the population of Greater Eskişehir. The total population of the district (which includes the rural area) was 296,704 as of 2012.

History 
Up to 1993 Tepebaşı was a part of Eskişehir municipality. In 1993, the municipality of Tepebaşı was established within Eskişehir metropolitan center. In 2008 district of Tepebaşı governorate was also established.

Living 
Anadolu University, is the core of cultural activities. According to one survey, 31% of the urban residents are university graduates. Both Eskişehir Central Station and Eskişehir intercity bus terminal as well as the airbase are in Tepebaşı.  There are also shopping centers and museums. In addition to education, the accommodation, health, entertainment and congress tourism are among the service sectors of the economy. Main industry around Tepebaşı include a locomotive factory (Tülomsaş) and a sugar refinery.

Rural area 
There are 42 villages and one town in the rural area of Tepebaşı. The total population of the district is (urban and rural) 305,632.

References 

Eskişehir
Populated places in Eskişehir Province